35 Canadian Brigade Group (35CBG) is part of 2nd Canadian Division, under the Canadian Army of the Canadian Forces. It is headquartered in Quebec City, Quebec. It is the successor of the Cold War era Quebec Militia District.

Brigade units

See also

34 Canadian Brigade Group, the other such brigade formation in the province of Quebec.

References 

Brigades of the Canadian Army
Organizations based in Quebec City